Harlaniella podolica is a problematic Ediacaran species of elongate, striated or crudely 'segmented' tubes, once thought to represent a trace fossil, but now believed to represent internal casts of the body of an unknown organism.

References

Incertae sedis
Ediacaran life